Kina Kadreva (27 September 1931 – 27 July 2020) was a Bulgarian author. She is best known for the children's book "The Milk Tree" from 1962, and "Dragon under a down pillow" from 1996.

References

1931 births
2020 deaths
Writers from Burgas
Bulgarian women writers
Bulgarian children's writers
Place of death missing
20th-century Bulgarian writers